is a Japanese footballer who plays as a forward or a winger for  club Renofa Yamaguchi FC, on loan from Kawasaki Frontale.

Club career
Takai was promoted to the Kawasaki Frontale first team ahead of the 2022 season. He made his debut in a resounding 8–0 win over Guangzhou.

In December 2022, it was announced that Igarashi would be joining J2 League club Renofa Yamaguchi FC on a season-long loan for the 2023 season.

Career statistics

Club
:

References

2003 births
Living people
People from Sagamihara
Association football people from Kanagawa Prefecture
Japanese footballers
Association football forwards
Kawasaki Frontale players
Renofa Yamaguchi FC players